The 1942 Maine Black Bears football team was an American football team that represented the University of Maine as a member of the New England Conference during the 1942 college football season. In its first season under head coach William C. Kenyon, the team compiled a 2–4 record (0–2 against conference opponents).  The team played its home games at Alumni Field in Orono, Maine. Ray Neal and Robert Nutter were the team captains.

Schedule

References

Maine
Maine Black Bears football seasons
Maine Black Bears football